Aldegonda Petronella Huberta Maria "Connie" Palmen (born 25 November 1955) is a Dutch author.

Palmen debuted with the novel De wetten (1990), published in the United States as The Laws (1993), translated by Richard Huijing. The Laws was shortlisted for the 1996 International Dublin Literary Award.

Her second novel was De vriendschap (1995), published in the United States as The Friendship (2000), translated by Ina Rilke. It is the story of the lifelong friendship of two girls with completely different characters.

Palmen had a relationship with Ischa Meijer in the years preceding his death in 1995. From 1999 on she lived with D66 politician Hans van Mierlo until his death on 11 March 2010. The couple married on 11 November 2009

Awards and honors
2016 Libris Prize for Jij zegt het

Published works 
 1991 De Wetten (1993 The Laws)
 1995 De Vriendschap (2000 The Friendship)
 1998 I.M.
 1999 De Erfenis ("Boekenweekgeschenk")
 2002 Geheel de uwe
 2007 Lucifer
 2015 Jij zegt het

References

1955 births
Living people
20th-century Dutch novelists
21st-century Dutch novelists
People from Roerdalen
21st-century Dutch women writers
20th-century Dutch women writers
Dutch women novelists